The Northern Ireland (Emergency Provisions) Act 1973 is an Act of the Parliament of the United Kingdom which abolished the death penalty for murder in Northern Ireland, and established the Diplock courts in which terrorist offences were tried by a judge without a jury. It has mostly been repealed, the anti-terrorism provisions having been superseded by subsequent legislation. The death penalty had not been used in Northern Ireland since 1961, when Robert McGladdery was hanged.

The Act banned membership under penalty of law in the following organisations:
 Irish Republican Army
 Cumann na mBan
 Fianna Éireann
 Saor Éire
 Sinn Féin
 Ulster Volunteer Force

The subsequent Elected Authorities (Northern Ireland) Act 1989 would require oaths renouncing these organisations (except Sinn Féin).

See also
Prevention of Terrorism Acts
Capital punishment in the United Kingdom

The Troubles (Northern Ireland)
United Kingdom Acts of Parliament 1973
Emergency laws in the United Kingdom
Acts of the Parliament of the United Kingdom concerning Northern Ireland
1973 in Northern Ireland
Constitutional laws of Northern Ireland